Schizaster is a genus of heart urchins belonging to the family Schizasteridae. The type species of the genus is Schizaster studeri.

Species
Extant and extinct species within this genus include:

 Schizaster alcaldei Sánchez Roig, 1949 † 
 Schizaster alsiensis Maccagno, 1947 † 
 Schizaster altissimus Arnold & H. L. Clark, 1927 † 
 Schizaster bathypetalus Arnold & H. L. Clark, 1927 † 
 Schizaster beckeri Cooke, 1942 † 
 Schizaster brachypetalus Arnold & H. L. Clark, 1927 † 
 Schizaster caobaense Sánchez Roig, 1949 † 
 Schizaster cojimarensis Sánchez Roig, 1949 † 
 Schizaster compactus (Koehler, 1914) 
 Schizaster costaricensis Durham, 1961 † 
 Schizaster delorenzoi Checchia-Rispoli, 1950 † 
 Schizaster doederleini (Chesher, 1972) 
 Schizaster dumblei Israelsky, 1924 † 
 Schizaster duroensis Kier, 1957 † 
 Schizaster dyscritus Arnold & H. L. Clark, 1927 † 
 Schizaster edwardsi Cotteau, 1889 -
 Schizaster eopneustes Lambert, 1933 † 
 Schizaster excavatus Martin, in Jeannet & Martin, 1937 † 
 Schizaster fernandezi Sánchez Roig, 1952 † 
 Schizaster floridiensis (Kier & Grant, 1965) 
 Schizaster gerthi Pijpers, 1933 † 
 Schizaster gibberulus L. Agassiz in L. Agassiz & Desor, 1847
 Schizaster gigas Sánchez Roig, 1953 † 
 Schizaster granti Duncan & Sladen, 1883 † 
 Schizaster guirensis Sánchez Roig, 1949 † 
 Schizaster habanensis Sánchez Roig, 1949 † 
 Schizaster hexagonalis Arnold & H. L. Clark, 1927 † 
 Schizaster humei Lambert, 1932 † 
 Schizaster hunti Kier, 1957 † 
 Schizaster jeanneti Martin, in Jeannet & Martin, 1937 † 
 Schizaster karkarensis Kier, 1957 † 
 Schizaster kinasaensis Morishita, 1953 † 
 Schizaster lacunosus (Linnaeus, 1758) 
 Schizaster leprosorum Lambert, 1933 † 
 Schizaster llagunoi Lambert & Sánchez Roig, in Sánchez Roig, 1949 † 
 Schizaster marci Castex, 1930 † 
 Schizaster miyazakiensis Morishita, 1956 † 
 Schizaster morlini Grant & Hertlein, 1956 † 
 Schizaster moronensis Sánchez Roig, 1951 † 
 Schizaster munozi Sánchez Roig, 1949 † 
 Schizaster narindensis Lambert, 1933 † 
 Schizaster ocalanus Cooke, 1942 † 
 Schizaster orbignyanus A. Agassiz, 1880 
 Schizaster ovatus (Lindley, 2004) 
 Schizaster pappi Thirring, 1936 † 
 Schizaster pentagonalis Sánchez Roig, 1953 † 
 Schizaster persica Clegg, 1933 † 
 Schizaster portisi Serra, 1932 † 
 Schizaster pratti Israelsky, 1933 † 
 Schizaster riveroi Sánchez Roig, 1952 † 
 Schizaster rojasi Sánchez Roig, 1952 † 
 Schizaster rotundatus (Döderlein, 1906) 
 Schizaster salutis Sánchez Roig, 1949 † 
 Schizaster sanctamariae Sánchez Roig, 1949 † 
 Schizaster santanae Sánchez Roig, 1949 † 
 Schizaster schlosseri Traub, 1938 † 
 Schizaster taiwanicus Hayasaka, 1948 † 
 Schizaster vedadoensis Sánchez Roig, 1949 †

The fossil record of the genus dates back to the Paleocene (age range: 66.043 to 0.012 million years ago). These fossils have been found all over the world.

References

Cyril Walker & David Ward (1993) - Fossielen: Sesam Natuur Handboeken, Bosch & Keuning, Baarn. 

Schizasteridae
Echinoidea genera
Extant Danian first appearances